Tamilnaduibacter is a Gram-negative, halotolerant and rod-shaped bacteria genus from the family of Alteromonadaceae with one known species (Tamilnaduibacter salinus). Tamilnaduibacter salinus has been isolated from sediments from the Thamaraikulam solar salt pan from Tamilnadu in India.

References

Alteromonadales
Monotypic bacteria genera
Bacteria genera